Yaroslavsky (masculine), Yaroslavskaya (feminine), or Yaroslavskoye (neuter) may refer to:

People
Yemelyan Yaroslavsky (Minei Gubelman), Soviet politician, leader of 1930s anti-religious campaign in the USSR
Zev Yaroslavsky (b. 1948), U.S. politician
Oleksandr Yaroslavsky (b. 1959), Ukrainian businessman, president of FC Metalist Kharkiv

Places:
Yaroslavsky District, name of several districts in Russia
Yaroslavsky (inhabited locality) (Yaroslavskaya, Yaroslavskoye), name of several inhabited localities in Russia
Yaroslavsky Rail Terminal, a rail terminal in Moscow, Russia
Yaroslavl Oblast (Yaroslavskaya Oblast), a federal subject of Russia

See also
Yaroslavl (disambiguation)